White House garden could refer to either of the following White House gardens:

White House Rose Garden
White House Vegetable Garden